Le téléphone sonne toujours deux fois !!  (The Telephone Always Rings Twice) is a 1985 French comedy film directed by Jean-Pierre Vergne.

Premise 
Marc Elbichon, private detective, investigates about a mysterious serial killer who signs his crimes overwriting a phone dial on the victim's front. To help him, he calls his friends Blacky and Franck, a reporter, Ugo Campani, and his man cleaner, Momo.

Data sheet 
Title : Le téléphone sonne toujours deux fois !!
Director : Jean-Pierre Vergne
Writers : Didier Bourdon, Seymour Brussel, Bernard Campan, Pascal Légitimus et Jean-Pierre Vergne
Producer : André Djaoui
Music : Gabriel Yared
Picture : Robert Fraisse
Editing : Nicole Berckmans
Shooting : 1984
Length : 1h32
Release : 23 January 1985

Cast

Didier Bourdon : Marc Elbichon / Marcel Bichon
Seymour Brussel : Franck Potin
Bernard Campan : Ugo Campani
Pascal Légitimus : Blacky
Smaïn : Momo
Clémentine Célarié : Annabella
Jean-Claude Brialy : The commissioner
Henri Courseaux : Doctor Clipps
Dominique Pinon : Professor Pichon
Michel Constantin : The cinema director
Darry Cowl : The policeman with Jeep
Patrick Sébastien : The blind
Jean Yanne : The man phoning
Michel Galabru : « Marraine »
Michel Crémadès : The optician
Jean Reno :  Marraine's confidence man
Annie Savarin : A victim
Julie Arnold : Pornographic actress

References

External links
 IMDb entry

1985 films
English-language French films
1980s English-language films
1980s French films